Bigova is a village in the municipality of Kotor, Montenegro.

Demographics
According to the 2011 census, its population was 101.

References

Populated places in Kotor Municipality
Mediterranean port cities and towns in Montenegro
Coastal towns in Montenegro
Serb communities in Montenegro